Anton Chichkan (born 10 July 1995) is a Belarusian professional footballer who plays for Dinamo Batumi.

Club career
On 17 January 2022, he signed a 2.5-year contract with Russian Premier League club Ufa. Chichkan left Ufa by mutual consent on 29 June 2022.

Honours
BATE Borisov
Belarusian Premier League champion: 2017, 2018
Belarusian Cup winner: 2019–20, 2020–21
Belarusian Super Cup winner: 2017

Career statistics

References

External links
 
 
 
 Profile at BATE website

1995 births
Living people
Footballers from Minsk
Belarusian footballers
Belarus under-21 international footballers
Belarus international footballers
Association football goalkeepers
FC BATE Borisov players
FC Smolevichi players
FC Ufa players
FC Dinamo Tbilisi players
FC Dinamo Batumi players
Belarusian Premier League players
Belarusian First League players
Russian Premier League players
Belarusian expatriate footballers
Expatriate footballers in Russia
Expatriate footballers in Georgia (country)
Belarusian expatriate sportspeople in Russia